The 2018 Cologne attack was an attack and subsequent hostage-taking that occurred at the central railway station of Cologne, Germany, on 15 October 2018.

Incident

On Monday 15 October 2018 at 12:30 German time the Syrian refugee Mohammed Abo R. entered a McDonald's fast food restaurant at the Cologne Central Station with a bag and a suitcase. In the restaurant he sat down at a table, drew a pistol, and spilled a flammable liquid on the floor. Shortly thereafter, he took a Molotov cocktail from his suitcase, ignited it and set the floor of the restaurant on fire.

The fire ignited the clothes of a 14-year-old German girl, who ran out of the restaurant in a panic. Passersby quickly extinguished the girl's burning clothes, who, despite the rapid reaction of the passersby, suffered severe burns to her legs. Surprised by the triggered fire sprinkler system, Mohammed had meanwhile fled the fast food restaurant and, armed with his gun, stormed into an adjacent pharmacy, where he took an employee hostage.

At 12:45 German time the first emergency calls reached the police. The police quickly evacuated the station and cordoned off the surrounding area. On the phone, the perpetrator stated his demands: Free passage to Syria, the release of a Tunisian woman and the return of his suitcase and bag from the McDonald's. He claimed to be a member of ISIL.

A two hour standoff led to no peaceful solution. The perpetrator in the meanwhile had poured gasoline over his hostage, put a Molotov cocktail in her hand and a lighter in her mouth. When he tried to set her on fire, the police attacked. At 14:55 German time a SEK team detonated two stun grenades, stormed the pharmacy and shot the perpetrator, who was still armed with his pistol. Three police officers fired a total of six rounds at Mohammed, of which several hit his upper body and one hit him in the head. The hostage was carried from the pharmacy and handed over to paramedics. Mohammed was dragged by the SEK Members to the square in front of the pharmacy, where CPR was applied and his wounds were treated by police medics.

Victims 
During the incident a total of three victims were wounded, some of them seriously

The Hostage 
The hostage was treated in a clinic after the incident. She suffered a shock and a gasoline poisoning. On Wednesday she was able to leave the hospital.

Lika M. 
The 14-year-old German girl Lika M., whose clothes were caught on fire by R.´s Molotov cocktail, was seriously injured. 10 percent of her skin was burned. She was treated in a children's hospital in Cologne. Eight surgeries and two skin transplants later she was able to leave the hospital in December 2018. Doctors expect her to make a full recovery.

Another Victim 
The fire department reported another victim. This person suffered smoke inhalation, but was able to leave the hospital on the same day.

Investigation

Crime Scene Investigation 
In the McDonald's, the bag and suitcase of the perpetrator were examined and declared safe by EOD Operators. Further Molotov cocktails, containers with a flammable liquid and several IEDs were found in the bags. The IEDs were gas cartridges modified with steel balls for maximum destruction. In the pharmacy the investigators found further containers with flammable liquid and further IEDs. Furthermore, an airsoft pistol and an identity document were seized.

Search of the Perpetrator's Apartment 
In the evening of the same day, R.'s apartment was stormed and searched by the police. This happened especially in view of a possible terrorist attack and other perpetrators. Large quantities of gasoline and Arabic characters were found in the apartment. The characters are not related to Islamism or ISIL. Multiple electronic devices were seized in the apartment including two mobile phones.

Terrorism 
In the beginning terrorism was a possible motive. During the investigation kept going no evidence of relations between Mohammed Abo R. and terrorism were found. The case was ruled non terrorism related.

Mental health issues 
After terrorism was ruled out, it was determined that Mohammed suffered from mental health issues. They found that he had been in psychotherapy since 2017 and was taking medication to combat depression. He was also suffering from gambling and drug addiction.

Legal proceedings
Police stated that they could not rule out a terror attack. The Cologne prosecutor's office charged Mohammed Abo R. with two counts of attempted murder, aggravated battery and hostage-taking. On 16 October 2018, the Public Prosecutor General took over investigations because there were "sufficient indications for a radical Islamist background." During the investigation no evidence for a terror related attack were found. In December 2018 the Public Prosecutor General gave the case back to the Cologne prosecutor's office. The investigation is still ongoing.

In June 2019, his pre-trial detention was suspended for six months and he was transferred to a specialist neurological clinic. Experts assume that Mohammed's stay at the clinic will allow him to recover to the point where he can participate in the trial.

Perpetrator
The perpetrator was named as Mohammad Abo R., a 55-year-old man of Arab, reportedly Syrian origin. He entered Europe during the peak of the European migrant crisis and was first intercepted by the authorities of the Czech Republic in early 2015. He filed an asylum application in the Czech Republic but then moved to Germany, where he filed an asylum application in March 2015. Under the Dublin Regulation, the German authorities should have expelled him to the Czech Republic, but they did not do so. He was given permission to stay in Germany until 2021.

Abo R. was known to the police. He had been charged 13 times since 2016, the charges included drug possession, theft, threat, fraud and trespassing. He was never convicted.

Wounds 
Mohammed was wounded by several shots, several projectiles hit him in the upper body and one projectile hit him in the head. He was carried by the SEK officers from the pharmacy to the square in front of the pharmacy where he was resuscitated by the officers and a female GSG9 doctor. After successful resuscitation, Mohammed was taken to the University Hospital of Cologne, where he underwent emergency surgery. He was later transferred to intensive care. On Tuesday, his condition remained critical. In a press conference on Wednesday, the police announced that the perpetrator was no longer in a life threatening condition, but was in a coma.

Two months after the incident, Mohammed woke up from the coma. He was later transferred to the prison hospital of North Rhine-Westphalia. Due to the gunshot wounds Mohammed is paralyzed on one side and must be artificially fed, fragments of the bullet are still stuck in his skull. According to a medical report, he is not able to take part in a court trial in his current condition.

Reactions
Cologne main station was completely locked down. Thousands of people, many travelers among them, gathered around the station.

See also 
 2018 Cologne terrorist plot a foiled plot earlier the same year

References 

2018 crimes in Germany
Crime in Cologne
Hostage taking in Germany
Improvised explosive device bombings in Germany
October 2018 crimes in Europe
October 2018 events in Germany
Refugees in Germany
2010s in Cologne